Yellow Pearl is a compilation album of songs recorded by Irish rock musician Phil Lynott; the only such compilation as of 2022. The album, released in 2010, features songs taken from Lynott's two solo albums, Solo in Soho and The Philip Lynott Album, together with rare singles, remixes and b-sides.

Many members of Lynott's band Thin Lizzy appear on the album including Scott Gorham, Brian Downey, Snowy White, Darren Wharton and Gary Moore. Dire Straits frontman Mark Knopfler plays on two tracks.

The title track "Yellow Pearl" is included in two remixed versions – this song had been used as the theme tune for the British TV programme Top of the Pops. Two rare b-sides, "Somebody Else's Dream" (from the "Together" single) and "Beat of the Drum" (from "Old Town") were released here for the first time on CD. Lynott's hit single with Gary Moore, "Parisienne Walkways", and his last single release, "Nineteen", were also featured.

The CD came with a booklet featuring photos and an essay by Malcolm Dome.

Track listing
All songs composed by Philip Lynott, except where noted.
"Yellow Pearl" [Second 7" remix] (Lynott, Midge Ure) – 3:22
"Dear Miss Lonely Hearts" (Jimmy Bain, Lynott) – 4:09
"King's Call" – 3:38
"A Child's Lullaby" – 2:41
"Tattoo (Giving It All Up for Love)" – 3:18
"Solo in Soho" – 4:13
"Girls" (Bain, Lynott, Brian Robertson) – 3:58
"Ode to a Black Man" – 4:04
"Together" – 3:37
"Fatalistic Attitude" – 4:28
"The Man's a Fool" – 2:58
"Old Town" (Bain, Lynott) – 3:25
"Cathleen" – 3:34
"Little Bit of Water" – 3:33
"Ode to Liberty (The Protest Song)" (Bain, Lynott) – 5:46
"Somebody Else's Dream" – 4:23
"Beat of the Drum" (Lynott, Jackie Daly, Johnny "Ringo" McDonagh, Brian Downey) – 3:43
"Nineteen" [Extended Version] – 5:26
"Parisienne Walkways" (Lynott, Gary Moore) – 3:20
"Yellow Pearl" [First version] (Lynott, Ure) – 4:06

"Parisienne Walkways" was originally released as a Gary Moore solo track.

Personnel
Philip Lynott – bass guitar, guitar, keyboards, vocoder, drum machines, percussion, vocals
Scott Gorham – guitar (tracks 2, 5, 8), bass guitar (track 14)
Snowy White – guitar (tracks 2, 6)
Mark Knopfler – guitar (tracks 3, 15)
Gary Moore – guitar (track 19)
Jerome Rimson – bass guitar (tracks 6, 9)
Fiachra Trench – strings (tracks 4, 5)
Jimmy Bain – piano, bass guitar, keyboards, string machine (tracks 7, 11, 12)
Billy Currie – ARP synthesizer (track 7)
Midge Ure – ARP Synthesizer, minimoog, string machine, drum machine (tracks 1, 9, 20)
Darren Wharton – keyboards, drum machine
Brian Downey – drums, percussion
Mark Nauseef – drums, percussion
Bob Benberg – drums, percussion (tracks 7, 14)
Rusty Egan – drums (tracks 11, 12, 13)
Andy Duncan – percussion (tracks 4, 6)
Huey Lewis – harmonica (track 13)
Lena – backing vocals (track 1, 7, 20)
Julia – backing vocals (track 6)
Sophie – backing vocals (track 7)
Margi – backing vocals (track 7)
Silver – backing vocals (track 7)
Christine – backing vocals (track 7)
Monica Lynott – backing vocals (track 13)
Gordon Johnson – intro voice (track 12)
Suzanne Machon – intro voice (track 13)

2010 greatest hits albums
Phil Lynott albums